Daniel (secular name David Anthony Brum; born November 16, 1954) is the hierarch of the Orthodox Church in America, archbishop of the Diocese of Chicago and the Midwest.

Biography 
He was born in Fresno, California, on November 16, 1954, to Orville and Marjory Brum, the eldest son in a Roman Catholic family. He was raised in Riverdale, a Portuguese-American area, and graduated high school in 1973.

He enrolled in St Patrick's College Seminary, Mountain View, where he discovered the history of Orthodoxy and attended services at St Nicholas Church, Saratoga. He began reading the Church Fathers in the 1970s and tried to integrate his private study into his regular study. He graduated with a Bachelor of Arts in humanities (specialising in history, philosophy and English literature) before entering Saint Patrick's Seminary in Menlo Park, graduating with a Masters of Divinity in 1981 and being ordained a Roman Catholic priest that same year. He served in a variety of capacities, including in the Portuguese-American community (and editor of the Portuguese-language page of the diocesan newspaper) and as diocesan Director of Vocations.

He was asked by his bishop to continue further studies in 1992, and, in 1995, received a JCL (degree in canon law) from the Catholic University of America, Washington, D.C. During this time, his relationship with Orthodoxy continued with his research, and his study of canon law brought him closer to Orthodoxy. He nevertheless returned to his diocese and was assigned to the Diocesan Tribunal and a small, rural mission parish.

It was ultimately his study of canon law that brought him to petition to be received into the Orthodox Church in America, and he was received by vesting by Bp Tikhon (Fitzgerald) of San Francisco and the West at the Monastery of St John of Shanghai & San Francisco. He served at St Nicholas Church, Saratoga, until he was assigned to St Paul the Apostle Church in Las Vegas. He was transferred to the Diocese of New York and New Jersey in August 1998 and assigned rector of St Gregory Palamas Mission, Flemington, New Jersey. He was appointed Secretary to Metropolitan Theodosius (Lazor) in 2000, continuing his service under Metropolitan Herman (Swaiko). He also served on several Church committees and commissions, including those utilising his knowledge of canon law.

In December 2005, he asked to return to parish ministry, and in July 2006 he was transferred to the Diocese of the West and appointed Rector of Sts Peter and Paul Church, Phoenix. He was elected a member of the Diocesan Council in October 2006.

Since July 24, 2012 in addition to his duties at SS. Peter and Paul Church, Phoenix, AZ, is appointed Dean of the Desert Deanery.

On April 7, 2014, he was tonsured by Archbishop Benjamin (Peterson) a monastic at the Monastery of St John of Shanghai, receiving the name Daniel.

On October 21, 2014, he was canonically elected Bishop of Santa Rosa, to serve as Auxiliary Bishop to Archbishop Benjamin (Peterson) of San Francisco. He was elevated to Archimandrite on October 23, 2014, by Bishop Mark (Maymon).

On January 24, 2015, at Holy Trinity Cathedral, San Francisco, he was consecrated Bishop of Santa Rosa by: Metropolitan Tikhon (Mollard); Archbishop Benjamin (Peterson) of San Francisco and the West; Bishop John (Roshchin) of Naro-Fominsk; Archbishop Nathaniel (Popp) of Detroit and the Romanian Episcopate, Archbishop Melchisedek (Pleska) of Pittsburgh and Western Pennsylvania; Bishop Michael (Dahulich) of New York and New Jersey; Bishop David (Mahaffey) of Sitka and Alaska; Bishop Paul (Gassios) of Chicago and the Midwest.

On July 18, 2022, Holy Synod of OCA elected him as the bishop of the Diocese of Chicago and the Midwest. A three-day celebration took place in Chicago from September 30 through October 2, celebrating the feast of the Protection of the Most Holy Theotokos, and the enthronement of the twelfth hierarch of Chicago and the Diocese of the Midwest, Bishop Daniel

On November 11, 2022, he was unanimously elevated to the dignity of Archbishop by the OCA Holy Synod.

References

Living people
1954 births
21st-century bishops
Bishops of the Orthodox Church in America
Converts to Eastern Orthodoxy from Catholicism